Swan Song is a 2021 American science fiction romantic drama film written and directed by Benjamin Cleary (in his feature directorial debut). The film stars Mahershala Ali, Naomie Harris, Awkwafina, Glenn Close, and Adam Beach.

Swan Song was released in select cinemas and on Apple TV+ on December 17, 2021.

Plot
When a loving husband and father Cameron Turner is diagnosed with a terminal illness, he is presented with the option of sparing his family grief by having him replaced with a clone. Turner is torn about whether to discuss the option with his wife.

Cast
 Mahershala Ali as Cameron Turner, a family man suffering from a terminal illness.
 Ali also portrays Jack, Cameron's clone.
 Naomie Harris as Poppy Turner, Cameron's wife.
 Awkwafina as Kate, a previously cloned human.
 Glenn Close as Dr. Scott, the brash director of human cloning.
 Adam Beach as Dalton
 Lee Shorten as Rafa

Production
In February 2020, Apple TV+ announced it had acquired the rights to the film, to be written and directed by Benjamin Cleary and star Mahershala Ali. In September, Naomie Harris joined the cast, and Awkwafina  and Glenn Close signed on in November. Adam Beach announced he was added to the cast in December.

Principal photography began on November 9, 2020 in Vancouver, Canada and concluded on February 6, 2021. The film was released on December 17, 2021.

Reception
 On Metacritic, the film has a weighted average score of 66 out of 100, based on 27 critics, indicating "generally favorable reviews".

Accolades

References

External links
 
 Official screenplay

2021 drama films
2020s English-language films
American drama films
Anonymous Content films
Films about cloning
Films shot in Vancouver
Apple TV+ original films
2020s American films